Seleniko is the fourth album by Finnish folk group Värttinä, and second after they re-formed in 1990, released in Finland by Spirit and Polygram Finland in 1992. It immediately reached the top of the European World Music radio charts, and remained there for 3 months. In 1993, it was released by Music & Words in Benelux and Xenophile Records in the United States. NorthSide re-released the album in 1998 in the United States.

The song "Matalii ja mustii" was featured on the episode "Binky Rules/Meet Binky" of the children's show Arthur in the United States, and also appears on the first Arthur soundtrack.

Track listing
"Seelinnikoi" (music: tradition, lyrics: Sari Kaasinen, arrangement: Janne Lappalainen, Tom Nyman, Riitta Potnoja, Kari Reiman) – 3:40
"Lemmennosto" / "Awakening of Love" (music & lyrics: S. Kaasinen, arr.: Nyman, Reiman, Tommi Viksten) – 2:53
"Kylä vuotti uutta kuuta" / "The Village Awaits the New Moon" (music & lyrics: trad., arr.: S. Kassinen, Lappalainen, Nyman, Reiman) – 5:08
"Sulhassii" / "Bride Grooms" (music: trad., lyrics & arr.: S. Kaasinen) – 2:55
"Matalii ja mustii" / "Sad and Mournful" or "Short and Black" (music & lyrics: trad. arr.: Nyman, Reiman, Viksten) – 2:57
"Hoptsoi" (music: Reiman, arr.: Reijo Heiskanen, Laapaleinen, Nyman, Reiman) – 3:21
"Suuret ja soriat" / "Tall and Handsome" (music: Reiman, lyrics: Reiman/trad., arr.: Nyman, Reiman) – 3:42
"Leppiäinen" / "Gentle as Alder" (music: Reiman/trad., lyrics: S. Kaasinen/trad., arr.: S. Kaasinen, Lappalainen, Reiman) – 2:45
"Pihi neito" / "Stingy Girl" (music: trad., lyrics: S. Kaasinen, arr.: Lappalainen, Nyman, Reiman) – 2:41
"Mika miulla mielessa" / "What's on my mind?" (music: trad., lyrics: S. Kaasinen, arr.: S. Kaasinen, Lappalainen, Nyman, Reiman) – 3:38
"Kiirama" (music: Reiman, arr.: Heiskanen, Lappalainen, Nyman, Potinoja, Reiman) – 3:36
"Hyvä tyttönä hypätä" / "Good to Stay a Single Girl" (music: trad., lyrics: S. Kaasinen, arr.: Heiskanen, S. Kaasinen, Lappalainen, Nyman, Potinoja, Reiman) – 3:45
"Fanfaari" / "Fanfare" (music: trad., lyrics & arr.: S. Kaasinen) – 2:16
"Paukkuvat pasuunat" / "Thundering Trumpets" (music: trad., lyrics: S. Kaasinen, arr.: S. Kaasinen, Lappalainen, Nyman, Reiman)  – 4:02

Personnel

Värttinä
Mari Kaasinen - vocals
Sari Kaasinen - vocals
Kirsi Kähkönen - vocals
Sirpa Reiman - vocals
Reijo Heiskanen - guitar, bouzouki (track 7), percussion (1,3)
Janne Lappalainen - bouzouki, soprano saxophone, tenor saxophone, kaval, tin whistle
Tom Nyman - string bass, keyboard (3, 14), domra
Riitta Potinoja - 5-row accordion, keyboard (11)
Kari Reiman - fiddle, kantele, tenor banjo

Guests
Janne Haavisto - percussion (8)
Anu Laakkonen - trumpet
Tom Nekljudow - percussion

Singles

Kylä Vuotti Uutta Kuuta, Seelinnikoi
A single containing "Kylä Vuotti Uutta Kuuta" and "Seelinnikoi" from this album was released in 1992 in Finland by Polygram.

Pihi Neito, Matalii ja Mustii
In 1993, a second single from this album, containing "Pihi Neito" and "Matalii ja Mustii", was released by PolyGram in Finland.

External links
Värttinä's page on album, with lyrics and samples
NorthSide page on album

1992 albums
Värttinä albums